James L. "Jim" Bean (December 15, 1933 – July 7, 2013) was an American politician.

Born in Clanton, Alabama, Bean served in the United States Air Force during the Korean War. He was a business owner of Holloway Transfer and Storage in Hattiesburg, Mississippi. Bean served in the Mississippi State Senate 1988-2000 from Forrest and Lamar Counties as a Republican. He died in Hattiesburg, Mississippi.

Notes

1933 births
2013 deaths
People from Clanton, Alabama
People from Hattiesburg, Mississippi
Republican Party Mississippi state senators
Businesspeople from Mississippi
20th-century American businesspeople